Clearwater Central Catholic High School is a private college preparatory school for grades 9 through 12 and located in Clearwater, Florida, in the Roman Catholic Diocese of Saint Petersburg. Founded in 1962, the school enrolls approximately 500 students from the Tampa Bay area. Clearwater Central Catholic High School is an international IB World School.

Clearwater Central Catholic's mascot is the Marauder and the school's motto is Tolle Lege (Latin:"Take up and read"), a phrase  from Book 8 of Saint Augustine's Confessions.

History
The school was founded in February 1962 with the groundbreaking of its first building. CCC opened its doors in September 1963 with a seven-member staff and an enrollment of 96 students. In 1964, the first graduating class consisted of 26 students. The school has been awarded Blue Ribbon School of Excellence status.

Sports
CCC athletes and teams have won 325 District, Sectional and Regional Championships. Teams representing the school have participated in 92 Final Four’s with 21 state runner-up finishes and a total of 36 State Championships! Individual athletes have participated in FHSAA Championship events and have won 21 individual State Championships! When we look at team and individual appearances after winning District Championships, CCC’s athletic program has appeared 475 times in FHSAA Championship events. In the school years of 1999-2000 and 2003-2004 CCC received from the FHSAA the prestigious Fred E. Rozelle Sportsmanship Award recognizing schools that exhibit exemplary sportsmanship during the regular season and FHSAA Championships.
The Athletic Program has been recognized by the St. Petersburg Times in 1996-1997 with the "All Sports Award" and by the Florida Athletic Coaches Association and the Florida High School Activities Association in 1977-1978, 1978-1979, and 1979-1980 for having the "Most Successful Athletic Program in the State".

Notable alumni

Joe Belfiore (graduated 1986) - Senior Vice President for Windows at Microsoft Corporation, Joe has been recognized as a tech leader for his user experience work on Windows and other Microsoft products, as well as being a TED Speaker in 2004.  Joe was awarded as a CCC Distinguished Alum  
Riley Cooper (graduated 2006) – former starting Wide Receiver for the Florida Gators who was drafted in the 5th round of the 2010 NFL Draft by the Philadelphia Eagles. His jersey number in the NFL was 14, unlike the number 11 jersey he wore while playing football at CCC and Florida.
Kyle Curinga (graduated 2012) - professional soccer player currently playing for the Hartford Athletic.
Brooke Magnanti (graduated 1992) – scientist and international bestselling writer under the pen name of 'Belle de Jour'.
Colin McCarthy (graduated 2006) – former starting Middle Linebacker for the Miami Hurricanes where he wore the number 44 jersey.  He was drafted in the 4th round of the 2011 NFL Draft by the Tennessee Titans.
Jeff Smith (graduated 2015) – former starting Wide Receiver for the Boston College Eagles where he wore the number 6 jersey. Went undrafted in the 2019 NFL Draft and signed as an undrafted free agent with the New York Jets.
Ryan Webb (graduated 2004) – son of former MLB pitcher Hank Webb and currently a free agent pitcher.
Ryan Weber (graduated 2008) - Drafted by the Philadelphia Phillies in the 13th round. He then attended St. Pete College and was drafted again by the Atlanta Braves in the 22nd round. Currently a pitcher for the Boston Red Sox.
David Toups (graduated 1989) - Bishop of the Diocese of Beaumont

References

External links
 School Website

Catholic secondary schools in Florida
Buildings and structures in Clearwater, Florida
Educational institutions established in 1963
High schools in Pinellas County, Florida
1963 establishments in Florida
Roman Catholic Diocese of Saint Petersburg